La muette de Portici (The Mute Girl of Portici, or The Dumb Girl of Portici), also called Masaniello in some versions, is an opera in five acts by Daniel Auber, with a libretto by Germain Delavigne, revised by Eugène Scribe.

The work has an important place in music history as the earliest French grand opera. It is also known for its alleged role in the Belgian Revolution of 1830.

Background
The opera was first given at the Salle Le Peletier of the Paris Opéra on 29 February 1828. The role of Masaniello was taken by the famous tenor Adolphe Nourrit and Princess Elvire was sung by Laure Cinti-Damoreau. The dancer Lise Noblet played the mute title role, a part later taken by other dancers such as Marie Taglioni, Fanny Elssler and Pauline Leroux, also the actress Harriet Smithson (the future wife of Hector Berlioz). Alphonse was created by Alexis Dupont, who was Lise Noblet's brother-in-law.  The conductor at the premiere was Henri Valentino.

La muette was innovative in several ways. First, it marked the introduction into opera of mime and gesture as an integral part of an opera plot (these aspects were already familiar to Parisian audiences from ballet and mélodrame). Additionally, the historic setting, liberal political implications, use of popular melodies, handling of large orchestra and chorus, and spectacular stage effects immediately marked this opera as different from preceding types, later earning it the title of the first of the genre of "grand opera". The journal Pandore commented after the premiere, "for a long time, enlightened critics have thought that alongside the old tragédie lyrique it was possible to have a more realistic and natural drama which might suit the dignity of this theatre." The new genre was consolidated by Rossini's Guillaume Tell (1829) and Meyerbeer's Robert le diable (1831).

Richard Wagner remarked, in his 1871 Reminiscences of Auber, that the opera "whose very representation had brought [revolutions] about, was recognised as an obvious precursor of the July Revolution, and seldom has an artistic product stood in closer connection with a world-event." La muette was revived in Paris immediately after the French July Revolution of 1830.

Belgian revolution

The opera was chosen for a performance at the Théâtre de la Monnaie in Brussels on 25 August 1830, as part of King William I's festival in celebration of the 15th year of his reign. The opera would cap the three-day festival of fireworks, feasts, and processions. William I had been present at the Brussels premiere of the opera in 1829, and it enjoyed several successful performances in the city. When nationalist disturbances occurred during a performance around the time of the July Revolution in Paris, the opera was temporarily banned. The ban was lifted for the 25 August performance.

The King's festival announcement was met with open plans for revolt. Posters were put up around Brussels that advertised, "Monday, the 23rd, fireworks; Tuesday, the 24th, illuminations; Wednesday, the 25th, revolution." However, the King's only concession to public safety was to cancel the fireworks and procession on the final night, which left Auber's opera as the last public event in the king's honor. Though the subject of the opera is revolution, its role in the riots may have been more a marriage of convenience because the rebels had pre-ordained the final day of the festival as the start of the Belgian Revolution.

Prior to the performance of Auber's opera, the  newspaper issued a coded call for attendees to leave prior to the fifth act. There are some disagreements about when in the opera the exodus actually began, but the most commonly cited moment is the second act duet "Amour sacré de la patrie". One contemporary account describes what happened in the theater during the duet:

When Lafeuillade and Cassel began singing the celebrated duet. "Amour sacre de la patrie" enthusiasm exploded irresistibly and [the singers] found it necessary to start afresh in the midst of the cheering. Finally, when Masaniello (Lafeuillade) launched into his entreaty, the invocation Aux armes!, the public could no longer be restrained. They acclaimed aria and actor, they booed the fifth act in order to stop the performance, and the delirious crowd [hurled itself] out of the hall—into history. Welcomed by the other crowd which waited outside, it joined in the demonstrations which loosed the revolution of 1830.

Roles

Synopsis
The opera is loosely based on the historical uprising of Masaniello against Spanish rule in Naples in 1647. The character of Fenella, the opera's eponymous heroine, was borrowed from Walter Scott's Peveril of the Peak, which features a deaf and dumb dwarf of the same name.

Act 1
The square before a chapel

We witness the wedding of Alfonso, son of the Viceroy of Naples, with the Spanish Princess Elvire. Alfonso, who has seduced Fenella, the Neapolitan Masaniello's mute sister and abandoned her, is tormented by doubts and remorse, fearing that she has committed suicide. During the festival Fenella rushes in to seek protection from the Viceroy, who has kept her a prisoner for the past month. She has escaped from her prison and narrates the story of her seduction by gestures, showing a scarf which her lover gave her. Elvire promises to protect her and proceeds to the altar, Fenella vainly trying to follow. In the chapel Fenella recognizes her seducer in the bridegroom of the Princess. When the newly married couple come out of the church, Elvire presents Fenella to her husband and discovers from the mute girl's gestures, that he was her faithless lover. Fenella flees, leaving Alfonso and Elvire in sorrow and despair.

Act 2
On the beach

The fishermen, who have been brooding in silence over the tyranny of their foes, begin to assemble. Pietro, Masaniello's friend, has sought for Fenella in vain, but at length she appears of her own accord and confesses her wrongs. Masaniello is infuriated and swears to have revenge, but Fenella, who still loves Alfonso, does not mention his name. Then Masaniello calls the fishermen to arms and they swear perdition to the enemy of their country.

Act 3
The Naples marketplace

People go to and fro, selling and buying, all the while concealing their purpose under a show of merriment and carelessness. Selva, the officer of the Viceroy's body-guard, from whom Fenella has escaped, discovers her and the attempt to rearrest her is the sign for a general revolt, in which the people are victorious.

Act 4
Masaniello's house

Fenella comes to her brother's dwelling and describes the horrors, which are taking place in the town. The relation fills his noble soul with sorrow and disgust. When Fenella has retired to rest, Pietro enters with comrades and tries to excite Masaniello to further deeds, but he only wants liberty and shrinks from murder and cruelties.

They tell him that Alfonso has escaped and that they are resolved to overtake and kill him. Fenella, who hears all, decides to save her lover. At this moment Alfonso begs at her door for a hiding-place. He enters with Elvire, and Fenella, though at first disposed to avenge herself on her rival, pardons her for Alfonso's sake. Masaniello, reentering, assures the strangers of his protection and even when Pietro denounces Alfonso as the Viceroy's son, he holds his promise sacred. Pietro with his fellow-conspirators leaves him full of rage and hatred.

Meanwhile, the magistrate of the city presents Masaniello with the Royal crown and he is proclaimed King of Naples.

Act 5
Before the Viceroy's palace

In a gathering of fishermen, Pietro confides to Moreno that he has administered poison to Masaniello, in order to punish him for his treason, and that the King of one day will soon die. While he speaks, Borella rushes in to tell of a fresh troop of soldiers, marching against the people with Alfonso at their head. Knowing that Masaniello alone can save them, the fishermen entreat him to take the command of them once more and Masaniello, though deadly ill and half bereft of his reason, complies with their request. The combat takes place, while an eruption of Vesuvius is going on. Masaniello falls in the act of saving Elvire's life. On hearing these terrible tidings Fanella rushes to the terrace, from which she leaps into the abyss beneath, while the fugitive noblemen take again possession of the city.

Influence
La muette de Portici played a major role in establishing the genre of grand opera. Many of its elements – the five-act structure, the obligatory ballet sequence, the use of spectacular stage effects, the focus on romantic passions against a background of historical troubles – would become the standard features of the form for the rest of the 19th century. Grand opera would play a far more important role in the subsequent career of the librettist than that of the composer. Auber went on to write three more works in the genre: Le Dieu et la bayadère (1830), Gustave III (1833) and Le lac des fées (1839). But their fame would be eclipsed by the grand operas for which Scribe provided the libretti: Meyerbeer's Robert le diable (1831) and Les Huguenots (1836) and Halévy's La Juive (1835). Nevertheless, Auber's pioneering work caught the attention of the young Richard Wagner, who was eager to create a new form of music drama. He noted that in La muette, "arias and duets in the wonted sense were scarcely to be detected any more, and certainly, with the exception of a single prima-donna aria in the first act, did not strike one at all as such; in each instance it was the ensemble of the whole act that riveted attention and carried one away...".

It also played a large role in the founding of the Kingdom of Belgium. The riots that led to the independence started after hearing the opera.

This opera is the inspiration for Letitia Elizabeth Landon's poem  published in The Keepsake, 1836.

The material has been used for several films: the American silent film The Dumb Girl of Portici (1916), the German silent film Die Stumme von Portici, the Italian film La muta di Portici (1952).

Recordings and performances
La muette de Portici: June Anderson, Alfredo Kraus, John Aler, Ensemble Choral Jean Laforge, Orchestre Philharmonique de Monte-Carlo, conducted by Thomas Fulton, recorded in September 1986 at the Salle Garnier in Monte Carlo (EMI). . 2 Hours 29 Mins.
 La muette de Portici Oscar de la Torre (tenor) – Alphonse,  Angelina Ruzzafante (soprano) – Elvire,  Angus Wood (tenor) – Lorenzo, Ulf Paulsen (baritone) – Selva, Anne Weinkauf (mezzo) – Eine Holdame, Diego Torre (tenor) – Masaniello, Wiard Witholt (bass) – Pietro, Kostadin Arguirov (baritone) – Borella,  Stephan Biener (bass) – Moreno; Opernchor des Anhaltischen Theaters, /Anthony Hermus; recorded 24–26 May 2011, Großes Haus of the Anhaltisches Theater, Dessau, Germany CPO 777 694-2 [65:47 + 69:32]

References
Notes

Sources
 Auber, Daniel (1828). La muette de Portici, full score. Paris: E. Troupenas. . Copy at Gallica.
 
 
 
 

 
 .
  .
 
 
 
 
 Scribe, Eugène (1875). Oeuvres complètes: Operas, Ballets. Paris: E. Dentu. Copy at HathiTrust; copy at Google Books.
 
 

 .

Further reading
 
 Mondelli, Peter (2013). "The Sociability of History in French Grand Opera: A Historical Materialist Perspective", in 19th Century Music vol. 37, no. 1.
 Parker, Roger, The Oxford Illustrated History of Opera, Oxford University Press, 1994
 Renieu, Lionel, L'Histoire des Théâtres de Bruxelles: depuis leur origine jusqu'à ce jour, Duchartre & Van Buggenhoudt, 1928.
 Warrack, John and West, Ewan, The Oxford Dictionary of Opera New York: Oxford University Press: 1992

External links

 
  The Standard Opera Glass Synopsis
 La muette de Portici, French libretto (Brussels, 1833) at Google Books
  Masaniello, ovvero, La muta di Portici, Italian libretto (Palermo, 1860) at Google Books
 Masaniello, English and Italian libretto (Boston, 1865) at Google Books
 , a painting by Alfred Edward Chalon of a scene from the opera, engraved by J. C. Edwards for The Keepsake annual, 1836, combined with a poetical illustration (Fenella’s Escape) by Letitia Elizabeth Landon.

Grand operas
French-language operas
Operas by Daniel Auber
1828 operas
Opera world premieres at the Paris Opera
Operas set in Naples
Operas set in the 17th century
Operas
Libretti by Germain Delavigne
Libretti by Eugène Scribe
Art works that caused riots
Opera controversies
Operas adapted into films